Stromboli beebei is a species of sea snail, a marine gastropod mollusk in the family Fissurellidae, the keyhole limpets and slit limpets.

Description
The shell grows to a size of 40 mm.

Distribution
This species occurs in the southern Gulf of California, West Mexico

References

External links
 To World Register of Marine Species

Fissurellidae
Gastropods described in 1951